Luis Roberto da Silva (born 7 June 1977) is an East Timorese politician from KHUNTO. He is currently Vice-President of the National Parliament.

References 

1977 births
Living people
Kmanek Haburas Unidade Nasional Timor Oan politicians
Members of the National Parliament (East Timor)
Presidents of the National Parliament (East Timor)
21st-century East Timorese politicians